The Golden Christ (Spanish:El Cristo de oro) is a 1926 silent Mexican film directed by Manuel R. Ojeda. It stars Otilia Zambrano, Fanny Schiller, Mary Barquin, Lucila de Alva and Silvia Loya.

References

External links
 

1926 films
Mexican silent films
Films directed by Manuel R. Ojeda
Mexican black-and-white films